Colin Alexander "Collie" Campbell  (17 January 1901 – 25 December 1978) was a Canadian mining engineer, politician and curling administrator. Campbell was the president of the International Curling Federation from 1968 to 1978 and served as a Liberal Party member of the House of Commons of Canada. He was born in Shedden, Ontario.

Biography
Campbell attended school at Lawrence Station and high school in Dutton before further studies at Queen's University. His  father was active in local politics for more than three decades.

He was elected to Parliament at the Frontenac—Addington riding in a by-election on 24 September 1934 and re-elected in the 1935 federal election.

Campbell resigned on 11 August 1937 before the end of the 18th Canadian Parliament to enter provincial politics at the 1937 Ontario election. He was defeated on election day in the provincial district of Addington, but subsequently contested a by-election in Sault Ste. Marie after newly elected member Richard McMeekin resigned. He served as Minister of Public Works under premier Mitchell Hepburn, but left provincial politics at the 1943 Ontario election.

Campbell served with the Royal Canadian Engineers during World War II and was awarded the Order of the British Empire in 1943 and the Distinguished Service Order in 1945.

Following his time in office, Campbell served as president of the Northern Ontario Curling Association, and then president of the Canadian Curling Association from 1947 to 1948 and the International Curling Federation (now the World Curling Federation) from 1968 until his death in 1978. He was inducted into the Canadian Curling Hall of Fame in 1973, and the WCF Hall of Fame in 1990. The Collie Campbell Memorial Award for sportsmanship at the World Men's Curling Championship is named in his honour. On the ice, he played lead for Ontario at the 1951 Macdonald Brier, Canada's national men's curling championship.

Personal life
Campbell was married to Vera Smith and had five children. He died at the Toronto General Hospital.

See also
Canadian pipe mine

Notes

References

External links

Generals of World War II

1901 births
1978 deaths
Canadian military personnel from Ontario
Canadian mining engineers
Canadian Army personnel of World War II
Canadian generals
Liberal Party of Canada MPs
Ontario Liberal Party MPPs
Members of the Executive Council of Ontario
Members of the House of Commons of Canada from Ontario
Members of the Order of the British Empire
People from Elgin County
Queen's University at Kingston alumni
Curlers from Toronto
Politicians from Toronto
Canadian sportsperson-politicians
Canadian people of Scottish descent
Curling Canada presidents
Royal Canadian Engineers officers